Terral is a surname originating in 11th-century Britain, meaning "stubborn or obstinate person". Notable people with the surname include:

Boris Terral (born 1969), French actor
Gilles Terral (1943-1998), French entomologist
Samuel H. Terral (1835-1903), American judge
Tom Terral (1882-1946), American politician

See also
Terrell (disambiguation)
Terrill